John Huntley can refer to:

 John Huntley (cricketer) (1883-1944), New Zealand cricketer
 John Huntley (film historian) (1921-2003), English film historian
 John Huntley (footballer) (born 1967), English footballer